Dobrich may refer to:

Places in Bulgaria 
 Dobrich, a city
 Dobrich Province
 Dobrichka Municipality
 Dobrich, Haskovo Province, a village
 , a village in Yambol Province

People with the name 
 Hans Döbrich, German army pilot
 Virginia Dobrich, Uruguayan entertainer

See also 
 Dobric (disambiguation)